Northeast Wyoming Regional Airport  is five miles northwest of Gillette in Campbell County, Wyoming. It has scheduled airline flights.

Federal Aviation Administration records say the airport had 29,271 passenger boardings (enplanements) in calendar year 2016 and 28,383 in 2017. The National Plan of Integrated Airport Systems for 2011–2015 categorized it as a primary commercial service airport (more than 10,000 enplanements per year).

Facilities

The airport covers 894 acres (362 ha) at an elevation of 4,364 feet (1,330 m). It has two concrete runways: 16/34 is 7,500 by 150 feet (2,286 x 46 m) and 3/21 is 5,803 by 75 feet (1,769 x 23 m).

An air traffic control tower was built in the early 1980s.

In 2018 the airport had 12,318 aircraft operations, average 34 per day: 77% general aviation, 23% air taxi, <1% military and <1% airline. 65 aircraft were then based at the airport: 89% single-engine, 9% multi-engine, and 1% jet.

As of June 30, 2020, air traffic control tower operations were suspended.

Airline and destination

Key Lime Air provides charter flights from the airport. In addition, United Express operates flights to Denver.

Statistics

Top destinations

References

External links

 Gillette–Campbell County Airport, official site
 Flightline, Inc., the fixed-base operator (FBO)
 Aerial image as of June 1994 from USGS The National Map
 
 

Airports in Wyoming
Buildings and structures in Campbell County, Wyoming
Transportation in Campbell County, Wyoming